Datto is an American cybersecurity and data backup company. Founded in 2007 in Norwalk, Connecticut, in 2017 it became a subsidiary of the Vista Equity Partners and merged with Autotask Corporation.

History

Founding of Datto 
Founded in 2007 in Connecticut by software programmer Austin McChord, McChord initially built and marketed his own hand-made data backup devices. Securing his first customers in 2008, he afterwards built a system that allowed for data synchronization between two computers, before building a version of Zenith InfoTech that ran on Linux. 

By the end of 2009, the company had $70,000 in monthly sales. When a new Datto product in 2010 caused old systems to crash, a replacement system was designed from scratch: SIRIS was released several months later as a free upgrade. 

In 2011, sales were $9 million. The following year, they were at $25 million.

Global expansion 
In September 2013, the company raised $25 million in its first round of venture capital financing, which was led by General Catalyst Partners. The established business model sold products primarily through managed service providers. By 2013 the company was continuing to focus on small and mid-size businesses, with clients such as Susan G. Komen for the Cure and several NFL teams.

In 2014, Datto Inc. purchased Backupify, a cloud-to-cloud backup company. Backupify focused on backing up data on servers, complementing Datto's focus on local or private clouds.

In November 2015, the company garnered $75 million in a Series B funding round mostly led by Technology Crossover Ventures. In 2015, it became Connecticut's first "unicorn" company.

In early 2017, Datto acquired Open Mesh.

Datto was acquired by Vista Equity Partners for around $1.5 billion in late 2017. As part of the deal, Datto merged with the Vista portfolio company Autotask Corporation and Austin McChord remained CEO of the combined company.

McChord stepped down as CEO in October 2018, remaining on the board. In January 2019, following the announcement of McChord’s departure, Datto named Tim Weller as its new CEO. Weller joined Datto in 2017 as chief financial officer before stepping into the chief executive role. Before joining Datto, Weller was CFO at Akamai, where he led its initial public offering, and CFO at clean energy technology company EnerNOC.

In October 2020 Datto officially began trading on the New York Stock Exchange (NYSE) under the ticker symbol “MSP”, selling 22 million shares to raise $594 million in its IPO.

In January 2022, Datto announced it had acquired the Austin-based threat detection and response company, Infocyte,

Europe 
In July 2013 Datto acquired its UK distributor, Paradeon Technologies for an undisclosed sum and marked the start of Datto’s international expansion.

In 2016, Datto opened its EMEA headquarters in Reading. Datto also opened data centers in Iceland and Germany and signed new distribution deals in Spain and Greece. Additionally, in 2016, Datto released SIRIS 3 x 1 as the first available all-flash BCDR product with ransomware detection capability.

In September 2017 Datto opened a new office in Amsterdam to serve the BENELUX regions.

ANZ (NZ/AUS) 
Following the round of funding Datto expanded into Australia and New Zealand by opening a new office based in Sydney in late 2015.

Datto acquired Gluh, an Australian company, for an undisclosed sum in July 2020. Gluh’s platform enables MSPs to simplify the procurement of IT products and services for their customers.

Acquisition by Kaseya 
On April 11, 2022 Datto announced that they would be acquired by Kaseya, a provider of unified IT management and security software for managed service providers and small to medium-sized businesses. The acquisition, with funding led by Insight Partners, would value Datto at approximately $6.2 billion and provide Datto shareholders with $35.50 per share, which was a 52% premium to Datto’s unaffected stock price of $23.37 as of March 16, 2022.

"This is exciting news for Kaseya’s global customers, who can expect to see more functional, innovative and integrated solutions as a result of the purchase," said Fred Voccola, Kaseya’s CEO. "Datto has a legendary commitment to its customers and employees. The alignment of our missions and focus makes us a natural fit, that will help our greatly appreciated customers reach new levels of success. Kaseya is known for our outstanding track record of retaining the brands and cultures of the companies we acquire and supercharging product quality. We couldn’t be more excited about what lies before us - Kaseya and Datto will be better together to serve our customers."

The transaction closed in the second half of 2022.

Staff and facilities
Datto had 550 employees by November 2015, 700 employees by January 2017, and 883 workers by October 2017, 434 of whom were in Norwalk. As of March 2018 the number of employees had grown to 1,400. Datto has 1,600 employees as of November 2020.

Products and business model
Datto builds hardware and software for both data backup and recovery purposes.

In 2016 the company released its SIRIS 3 data protection platform.

RMM 
Datto RMM is a cloud-based remote monitoring and management platform that allows MSPs to manage IT infrastructure with automation tools like networking monitoring, patch management and remote control.

Datto RMM includes policy-based Windows and third-party software patching where partners have the option to store patch updates on the LAN to reduce bandwidth utilization or download them directly from Microsoft.

See also
Data recovery hardware
List of networking hardware vendors
List of data recovery software

References

External links
datto.com

American companies established in 2007
Software companies established in 2007
Defunct software companies of the United States
Computer security companies
Data companies
Companies formerly listed on the New York Stock Exchange
Software companies based in Connecticut
Companies based in Norwalk, Connecticut
2017 mergers and acquisitions
2020 initial public offerings
2022 mergers and acquisitions